Daeseongsan may refer to:
 Daeseongsan (Gangwon) in the counties of Hwacheon and Cheorwon, Gangwon-do, South Korea. 1175 metres.
 Daeseongsan (North Chungcheong/South Chungcheong) in the county of Okcheon, Chungcheongbuk-do, and the county of Geumsan, Chungcheongnam-do. 705 metres.
 Daeseongsan (South Gyeongsang) in the county of Sancheong, Gyeongsangnam-do. 593 metres.
 Taesongsan in Taesong-guyok, Pyongyang, North Korea. 270 metres.